Nelson is an unincorporated community in Boone County, West Virginia, United States. Its post office  has been closed.

References 

Unincorporated communities in West Virginia
Unincorporated communities in Boone County, West Virginia